The 2022–23 season is the 116th season in the history of FC Augsburg and their 11th consecutive season in the top flight. The club are participating in the Bundesliga and the DFB-Pokal.

Players

First-team squad

Out on loan

Transfers

In

Out

Pre-season and friendlies

Competitions

Overall record

Bundesliga

League table

Results summary

Results by round

Matches 
The league fixtures were announced on 17 June 2022.

DFB-Pokal

Statistics

Appearances and goals

|-
! colspan=14 style=background:#dcdcdc; text-align:center| Goalkeepers

|-
! colspan=14 style=background:#dcdcdc; text-align:center| Defenders 

|-
! colspan=14 style=background:#dcdcdc; text-align:center| Midfielders
 

 

|-
! colspan=14 style=background:#dcdcdc; text-align:center| Forwards 

 

 
|-
! colspan=14 style=background:#dcdcdc; text-align:center| Players transferred out during the season

Goalscorers

Last updated: 11 March 2023

References

FC Augsburg seasons
Augsburg